Edward Meeker (January 22, 1874 – April 19, 1937) was an American singer and performer, best known for his appearances on the recordings of Thomas Edison both as an announcer and singer, performing songs such as "Chicken Reel", "Go Easy Mabel", "Harrigan" and most notably, "Take Me Out to the Ball Game". Original music by Meeker includes, "That Railroad Rag" released in 1911. As well as reading vaudeville skits and providing sound effects throughout the remainder of his career.

Personal life 
Edward Meeker married Margaret Wood Meeker in 1895. 

Meeker was born in East Orange, New Jersey, on January 22 of 1874, and died in Orange, New Jersey, on April 19, 1937, at the age of 63.

In Popular Culture
Meeker's Rendition of "Take Me Out to the Ball Game" can be heard on the radio in Slender: The Arrival.

Meeker's appearance on Thomas Edison's cylinder recordings can be found on Apple Music.

References

External links 
 Rate Your Music profile
 Edward Meeker recordings from UCSB Cylinder Audio Archive

1874 births
1937 deaths
American male singers
Musicians from East Orange, New Jersey
Pioneer recording artists
Singers from New Jersey